Ajayan Vincent is an Indian cinematographer. He is the son of cinematographer and director, A. Vincent, and younger brother to Jayanan Vincent. He is known for his work in Malayalam, Tamil, Telugu, and Hindi language films.

Filmography
Thoovanathumbikal (1987)
Paadatha Thenikkal (1988)
Pagalil Pournami (1990)
Valli (1993)
Sahasa Veerudu Sagara Kanya (1996)
Ratchagan (1997)
Chandralekha (1998)
Chennakesava Reddy (2002)
Vamsi (2000)
3 Deewarein (2003)
Allari Pidugu (2005)
Bhramaram (2009)
Aagathan (2010)
Best Actor (2010)
Mylanchi Monchulla Veedu (2014)
Rudhramadevi (2015)

Awards

Tamil Nadu State Film Awards
 Best Cinematographer – Paadatha Thenikkal (1988)

References

External links
 

Cinematographers from Kerala
Malayalam film cinematographers
Indian Christians
Artists from Kozhikode
Living people
Tamil Nadu State Film Awards winners
Tamil film cinematographers
Year of birth missing (living people)